Born to Sing (lit. "National Singing Contest") is a 2013 South Korean comedy-drama film starring Kim In-kwon and directed by Lee Jong-pil. Produced by comedian and variety show host Lee Kyung-kyu, it was released in theaters on May 2, 2013.

The film is based on National Singing Contest, an actual TV show that is the longest-running Sunday TV program in Korea since its premiere in 1980. The show travels nationwide with its host/emcee Song Hae, and currently broadcasts on Sundays at 12:10 p.m. on KBS1 (its English title is Korea Sings). The touching and moving anecdotes shared by previous contestants led to the film Born to Sing, which tells the dynamic and intertwining stories of people seeking redemption at a singing contest.

Plot
The TV program National Singing Contest is set to film in the city of Gimhae, South Gyeongsang Province. 
Because the contest is well known as a ticket to becoming a star singer, a number of locals scramble to appear in the televised show.

Among the applicants is Bong-nam (Kim In-kwon), a financially inept, socially awkward man who works as an assistant at his wife's hair salon during the day and as a personal driver for intoxicated businessmen at night. But Bong-nam's lifelong dream has always been to sing. When he hears the news that the country's most popular singing contest will be held in his hometown, he takes part in the preliminary auditions without telling his wife Mi-ae (Ryu Hyun-kyung). But soon, his stunning performance makes him the talk of the town, and he becomes an overnight star among the middle-aged women in the city.

Hyun-ja (Lee Cho-hee) is Mi-ae's younger sister. She works for a local health drink company, and has a crush on Dong-soo, a guy in the PR department (Yoo Yeon-seok). The company CEO orders Hyun-ja to enter the singing contest in order to promote their drink, which she does with Dong-soo's help.

Mayor Joo Ha-na (Kim Soo-mi) is running for reelection and thinks an appearance in the contest will boost her bid. Unfortunately, she is tone-deaf and a terrible singer. Maeng (Oh Kwang-rok), the section chief at city hall, is in charge of helping the production while they film in Gimhae, and he gets pressured by the mayor to find a way of getting her in.

Bo-ri (Kim Hwan-hee) lives with her grandfather (Oh Hyun-gyung). She helps him prepare for his audition, though he keeps forgetting the lyrics. But Bo-ri's mother arrives and wants to immigrate to Canada. So her grandfather is determined to join the contest to leave a lasting memory for his granddaughter.

Cast
Kim In-kwon as Bong-nam
Ryu Hyun-kyung as Mi-ae 
Lee Cho-hee as Hyun-ja 
Yoo Yeon-seok as Dong-soo 
Kim Soo-mi as Mayor Joo Ha-na
Oh Hyun-gyung as Grandfather Oh
Kim Hwan-hee as Moon Bo-ri
Shin Eun-kyung as Bo-ri's mother
Oh Kwang-rok as Section chief Maeng
Kim Yong-gun as CEO Hong
Song Hae as himself
Kim Tae-won as himself
Yoo Yeon as Accidental sister
Jung Suk-yong as health store owner
Jung Kyung-soon as Mi-ae's mother
Lee Se-rang as hair salon customer
Kim Kyung-ae as elderly woman Hong
Seo Young-ju as screenwriter Jung
Seo Dong-soo as producer Shin
Kim Joong-ki as Chinese restaurant owner Jong-bae 
Lee Kyung-kyu as man in ending scene music video (cameo)

Awards and nominations
2014 50th Baeksang Arts Awards
Nomination - Best New Director: Lee Jong-pil

2014 34th Golden Cinema Festival
Best New Cinematographer: Kim Jong-seon

References

External links
  
 
 
 

2013 films
2010s musical comedy-drama films
South Korean musical comedy-drama films
2010s Korean-language films
2010s South Korean films